Mustilia columbaris is a moth in the family Endromidae. It is found in India.

The wingspan is 64–90 mm. Adults are pale red brown, suffused with grey. The forewings have an indistinct waved antemedial line and a dark spot at the end of the cell. There is also an oblique postmedial line, usually indistinct. The hindwings have an indistinct curved postmedial line.

The larvae are greenish brown and lighter behind, with a sphingid-like shape. The skin of the anterior part of the body may be expanded into broad lateral wings.

References

Moths described in 1886
Mustilia